The 54th 500 Mile International Sweepstakes was held at the Indianapolis Motor Speedway in Speedway, Indiana on Saturday, May 30, 1970.

Al Unser, Sr. dominated the race, winning the pole position and leading 190 laps en route to victory. He joined his brother Bobby as the first duo of brothers to win the Indianapolis 500; it was the first of his four victories at Indianapolis. Car owner Parnelli Jones, who won the race as a driver in 1963, became the second individual (after Pete DePaolo) to win separately as both a driver and as an owner.

Unser turned 31 a day earlier and took home $271,697 out of a record $1,000,002 purse. For the first time in Indy history, the total prize fund topped a million dollars.

Rain on race morning delayed the start by about thirty minutes. On the pace lap, Jim Malloy smacked the outside wall in turn four, which delayed the start further.

All 33 cars in the field were turbocharged for the first time. This was the final 500 in which the winner celebrated in the old Victory Lane at the south end of the pits; it was relocated nearer the finish line for 1971.

Race schedule
The race start time was scheduled for 12:00 noon local time, a slight departure from the traditional 11:00 am start time that was used during most of the 1960s. With the race scheduled for Saturday May 30, Speedway management announced that Sunday May 31 would be the designated rain date, the first time the race would be permitted to run on a Sunday. However, despite a brief rain delay on race morning, the full 500 miles was completed Saturday, and Sunday was not needed.

This would be the last Indy 500 that was scheduled for the traditional fixed date of May 30. Through 1970, Memorial Day was a fixed date holiday observed on May 30 regardless of the day of the week. For 1970, the date of May 30 fell on a Saturday. From 1911 to 1970, the race was scheduled for May 30, regardless of the day of the week, unless May 30 fell on a Sunday. In those cases, the race would be scheduled for Monday May 31. The Uniform Monday Holiday Act would take effect in 1971, and for 1971 and 1972, the race would be scheduled for the Saturday of Memorial Day weekend. In 1973, it was scheduled for Monday (but rain delayed it until Wednesday). From 1974 onward, it was scheduled for the Sunday of Memorial Day weekend. From 1974 onward, the race would only be held on May 30 if that date fell on a Sunday.

The annual Carburetion Days practice session, along with pit stop practice, on Wednesday May 27 was closed to the public.

Practice and time trials
Al Unser, Sr. set the fastest speed during practice, with a lap of 171.233 mph. Unser led the speed chart on five of the practice days, and was the only driver to crack the 170 mph barrier during the first two weeks. A. J. Foyt (169.173 mph) and Art Pollard (169.1 mph) were close behind.

John Cannon wrecked on Sunday May 10, and was unable to qualify. On Monday May 11, defending race winner Mario Andretti spun and wrecked in turn four. His car hit the inside wall twice, and the car was heavily damaged. Andretti was not injured.

On Tuesday May 12, Dennis Hulme's car caught fire in turn three. He bailed from the moving machine, suffering burns to his hands and feet. He withdrew due to the injuries.

Pole Day – Saturday May 16
Al Unser, Sr. won the pole position over Johnny Rutherford by 0.01 seconds, a record closest margin for the pole position at the time. A. J. Foyt rounded out the "all over 170 mph" front row. Unser's pole speed of 170.221 mph (his fastest single lap was 170.358 mph) was not a record – which marked the first time since the 1940s that two consecutive years went by without track records set during time trials at Indy.

Rain halted pole day qualifying at 3:42 p.m. with 17 cars in the field . A few cars (namely Lloyd Ruby, Gary Bettenhausen, and Peter Revson) were still waiting in line when the rains came. USAC officials closed the track for the day, and those cars were deemed ineligible for the pole round. In subsequent years, the rules would be changed to allow all cars in the original qualifying draw order at least one chance to make an attempt during the pole round, regardless if it extended into an additional calendar day due to rain.

Rookie Tony Adamowicz suffered bad luck during his attempt. On his first qualifying lap, the yellow light was turned on by error. He slowed down, and his first lap was turned in at 160.829 mph. The green light came back on moments later, and he completed the run. Although he had two laps over 166 mph, his first lap pulled his average down to 164.820 mph, and made him the second-slowest car in the field for the day.

Second Day – Sunday May 17
Three drivers shut out from the pole round came back to qualify on the second day. Peter Revson (167.942 mph) was the 9th-fastest car in the field, but lined up 18th due to being a second day qualifier. Lloyd Ruby went out for his first attempt, but when he raised his hand to signify the intent to start his attempt, the officials did not see it, and inadvertently waved him off. After he persuaded the officials for a do-over, he had a lap of 169.428 mph, but burned a piston on the fourth and final lap. The incident drew the ire of the team, as they felt the officials cost them a chance to be the day's fastest qualifier (for having run the extra laps). Ruby went out again later in the day with a new engine, but waved off after one slow lap.

Third Day – Saturday May 23
After a disappointing first weekend, Lloyd Ruby rebounded to complete his qualifying attempt at 168.895 mph. A busy day saw 14 attempts, and the field was filled to 33 cars. Two drivers (Bentley Warren and Tony Adamowicz) were bumped.

Bump Day – Sunday May 24
Jim McElreath put the fourth Foyt entry in the field, bumping Bartlett. No other cars, however, were able to show enough speed to make the field. Jigger Sirois, infamous for missing the 1969 race, fell far short in Jack Adam's Turbine car.

Alternates
First alternate: Arnie Knepper (#50, #53, #96)

Failed to qualify

Tony Adamowicz  (#36, #78)
Chris Amon  (#21, #73, #75)
Sonny Ates (#58, #59)
Kevin Bartlett  (#76, #77)
Tom Bigelow  (#34)
John Cannon  (#17, #21)
Larry Cannon  (#47)
Larry Dickson (#8, #78)
Darrell Dockery  (#62)
Charlie Glotzbach (#45)
Denny Hulme (#75)
Jim Hurtubise (#56)
Bruce Jacobi  (#71)
Jerry Karl  (#52)
Steve Krisiloff  (#92, #99)
Lee Kunzman  (#77, #99)
Al Loquasto  (#26, #35, #99)
Bruce McLaren  (#5, #79)
Butch Morley  (#63)
Carlos Pairetti  (#8)
Sam Posey  (#95)
Bill Puterbaugh  (#90)
Bill Simpson  (#28)
Jigger Sirois  (#54, #72)
Bud Tingelstad (#35)
Bob Veith (#90)
Bentley Warren  (#94)
Denny Zimmerman  (#50, #98, #99)

Race recap

Start
Rain delayed the start of the race by about 25 minutes. On the final pace lap, the field was coming through turn four to take the green flag. Suddenly, Jim Malloy on the outside of the third row, suffered a rear suspension failure, and smacked the outside wall. His car veered across the track to the inside, but narrowly avoided contact with any other car. The field was halted on the mainstretch under the red flag to clean up the accident. During the delay, team were permitted to top off their fuel tanks, after burning three laps of methanol.

The field was restarted after the red flag, and 32 cars took the green flag. Johnny Rutherford swept across to take the lead into turn one. Down the backstretch, Al Unser, Sr. tucked in behind, and took the lead going into turn three. Unser led the first lap.

Lloyd Ruby, who started 25th, notably passed ten cars on the first lap. By the third lap, Ruby was in the top ten.

First half
The early laps focused on the mad charge of Lloyd Ruby, who was up to 5th place by about lap 28. The yellow flag came out when Art Pollard blew an engine. Under the caution, Mario Andretti was forced to make an unscheduled pit stop to repair loose bodywork. He rejoined the race, but lost many positions.

As the race passed the 100-mile mark, Al Unser, Sr. led, with Johnny Rutherford running second, and A. J. Foyt and Lloyd Ruby battling for third.

Al Unser, Sr. led the first 48 laps. He gave up the lead to A. J. Foyt during a pit stop on lap 49. One lap later, Foyt entered the pits, giving the lead to Lloyd Ruby. Suddenly Ruby was given the black flag for smoke due to broken drive gears. Ruby's dramatic race was over after completing only 54 laps. Meanwhile, Johnny Rutherford stalled exiting the pits, losing considerable track position.

Unser re-took the lead on lap 54, and led until the halfway point. Mario Andretti once again had to make an unscheduled pit stop, this time to change the right rear tire. Through most of the race, he was experiencing handing issues with the right rear suspension.

Second half
Al Unser moved back to the front on lap 106, and he would not relinquish the lead. Johnny Rutherford, who was a factor in the first half, dropped out after 135 laps due to a broken header.

Roger McCluskey, who had dropped out on lap 62 with suspension damage, relieved Mel Kenyon on lap 112.

On lap 172, Roger McCluskey (driving for Kenyon), spun going into turn three, and crashed hard into the outside wall. Ronnie Bucknum was collected in the crash. Sammy Sessions locked up the brakes and nearly slid into the crashed cars. Sessions gained control, weaved his way through, and continued in the race. Spilled fuel started pouring from one of the crashed cars, and a small fire broke out. As the field approached the scene, several cars got into the fluid and spun. Wally Dallenbach and Jack Brabham spun but continued. Mario Andretti nearly spun out, but he made it through the scene unscathed. The fire was quickly extinguished, but the yellow light was on for over 14 minutes (lap 181) to clear the track.

Finish
With about 25 laps to go, Al Unser, Sr. had lapped the entire field. Unser's crew gave him the "E-Z" sign on his chalkboard, and both Mark Donohue and A. J. Foyt got their lap back.

With Unser leading comfortably, the focus became the battle for second between Mark Donohue and A. J. Foyt. With only a handful of laps left, Foyt suddenly slowed in turn one. He pulled to the apron, but stayed out on the track attempting to nurse the car to the finish line.

Al Unser, Sr. led a total of 190 laps en route to his first Indy victory. Unser won by 32.19 seconds over second place Mark Donohue. A very slow A. J. Foyt fell to 10th in the final standings.

Box score

Race statistics

Broadcasting

Radio
The race was carried live on the IMS Radio Network. Sid Collins served as chief announcer for the 23rd consecutive year. Len Sutton served as "driver expert" for the fifth year. At the conclusion of the race, Lou Palmer reported from victory lane. The entire on-air crew remained mostly consistent from 1966-1969. The broadcast came on-air at 11:30 am local time, with a thirty-minute pre-race show scheduled. However, the rain delay increased the pre-race coverage to almost an hour. After the death of Bill Dean, Jack Morrow assumed the role of producer.

The broadcast was carried by over 1,000 affiliates in all fifty states, AFN, the CBC, and reached locations such as Vietnam and had four foreign language translations. The broadcast had an estimated 120 million listeners worldwide.

Among the celebrity interviews Sid Collins conducted in the booth were Edie Adams, Dennis Hulme, Billy Shaw, Chris Economaki (ABC Sports), Larry Bisceglia, Sam Hanks, Pete DePaolo, Bill Holland, Senator Vance Hartke, Tony Hulman, Duke Nalon, Johnnie Parsons, and J. C. Agajanian. Astronaut Pete Conrad, who was a fellow passenger with Tony Hulman in the pace car for the second year in a row, was also interviewed during the pre-race coverage.

Television
The race was carried in the United States on ABC's Wide World of Sports. The broadcast aired on Saturday June 6. Jim McKay anchored the broadcast with Rodger Ward and Chris Economaki as analysts. Ward drove the pace car at the start of the race. It was the last time the "500" was not seen on over-the-air television the day of the race.

For the final time, the race was shown live on MCA closed-circuit television in numerous theaters across the United States. Charlie Brockman served as anchor.

The "Wide World Of Sports" broadcast has re-aired on ESPN Classic starting in May 2011.

Notes

See also
 1970 USAC Championship Car season

References

Works cited
1970 Indianapolis 500 Press Information – Daily Trackside Summary
Indianapolis 500 History: Race & All-Time Stats – Official Site
1970 Indianapolis 500 at RacingReference.info
1970 Indianapolis 500 Radio Broadcast, Indianapolis Motor Speedway Radio Network

Indianapolis 500 races
Indianapolis 500
Indianapolis 500
1970 in American motorsport